Tisdale is the business centre for the rich agricultural boreal forest area in central Saskatchewan, Canada. This town is in the Rural Municipality of Tisdale No. 427, Saskatchewan.

Located at the junction of Highway 35 and Highway 3, and serviced by both the Canadian National Railway and the Canadian Pacific Railway, Tisdale is the grain handling centre of the region with five inland grain terminals, and is the centre of regional industry.

This town is the administrative office of the Kinistin Saulteaux Nation band government.

History

English explorer Henry Kelsey passed through this area in 1690 during his exploration of the Carrot River.

The post office of Tisdale, provisional District of Saskatchewan, North-West Territories was created on 1 February 1904. The community was originally known as "Doghide" after the Doghide River that flows through the town, but with the arrival of the railway the community was renamed "Tisdale" in honour of F.W. Tisdale, an employee of the Canadian Northern Railway.

Western Canada's biggest gun shoot out took place just east of Tisdale in 1920. The historic gunfight involved a posse of Saskatchewan Provincial Police and four outlaws

In 2005, Tisdale celebrated its 100th birthday with a homecoming celebration in conjunction with Saskatchewan's centennial. The town also underwent beautification projects, including the construction of a new town square.

In 2016, Tisdale changed its town motto from "The land of rape and honey" to "Opportunity grows here".

Demographics 

Economy
For 60 years, until October 2015, Tisdale was known as the "Land of Rape and Honey" due to its significance in both rapeseed and honey production. Tisdale is also known as the Honey Capital of Saskatchewan. One third of the farmland in the Northeast region is cropped into canola and 10% of the honey produced in Canada comes from this area. Due to the obvious alternate meaning, industrial metal band Ministry named their 1988 album The Land of Rape and Honey after seeing the motto on a Tisdale souvenir mug. The town adopted the new motto "Opportunity Grows Here" on 22 August 2016.

Attractions
The world's second largest (only to that of Falher's) honey bee statue.
Falkon Theatre has operated since 1935.
Tisdale Stock Car Club hosts the Silvertown Speedway race track.
The Tisdale & District Museum is located in Henry Hamilton Park.

Parks
5 major parks are located within the town.
Some regional and provincial parks near Tisdale are:
Kipabiskau  Regional Park  is located in the Barrier Valley nearby.
Greenwater Lake Provincial Park is the largest neighbouring park.
Wapiti Valley Regional Park is located nearby on Codette Lake.
Wapiti Valley is a skiing venue for winter sports enthusiasts.
Doghide River Trail is a scenic nature trail located on the Doghide River.

Sports
Tisdale is the regional sports hub which boasts a 6 sheet curling rink, indoor and outdoor skating rinks, soccer and football fields, indoor gun range and one of Saskatchewan's most picturesque 9 hole golf courses situated along the Doghide River. Tisdale's sporting facilities draw teams and individuals from all over Northeast Saskatchewan and beyond.

Infrastructure
Tisdale Hospital is a 24-bed hospital with four doctors, an ambulance service, and long-term care facilities.
 
Tisdale has twelve churches, two schools, and the Cumberland Regional College.

Tisdale Airport has a paved runway 14/32 with ARCAL (Aircraft Radio Control of Aerodrome Lighting), two grass runways, 17/35 and 08/26, a terminal building, and several hangars.

Tisdale RecPlex
Tisdale RecPlex (Tisdale's Recreational Centre) is a large 100,000 square foot joint-use complex that includes the following:
Cumberland Regional College, 
Tisdale Middle and Secondary School
 The Wapiti Regional Library and the school library  
 a daycare
 a state of the art artificial ice arena and a 6 sheet curling rink
 The John Baron Auditorium 
 The Maurice Taylor Performing Arts Theatre.
An outdoor pool, outdoor ice rink, trails and playing fields are located on the grounds surrounding the complex.

Notable people
Susan Aceron, actress 
Brent Butt, comedian and actor 
Lyall Dagg, 1964 Canadian and World Curling Champion
Anne Edwards, politician 
Emily Farnham, 1993 curling hall of fame inductee
William King, politician
Lesley Magnus, field hockey player
Paul Nicklen, biologist and photographer
Ross Perkins, professional ice hockey player
Dean Schmeichel, Olympic wrestler
Sharon Thesen, poet

See also
Rural Municipality of Tisdale No. 427, Saskatchewan

References

External links

Towns in Saskatchewan
Division No. 14, Saskatchewan